The Boone County School District which operates schools in most of Boone County, Kentucky in the Cincinnati metropolitan area, is the third-largest in the Commonwealth of Kentucky by student enrollment (after Jefferson County and Fayette County). As of 2019, the district serves nearly 21,000 students and employs approximately 4,000 staff. The district currently operates 25 schools,

The far southern section of the county surrounding Walton is not served by the Boone County district. It is instead served by the Walton-Verona Independent Schools.

High schools
Boone County High School
Conner High School
Randall K. Cooper High School
Ryle High School
Ignite Institute

Middle schools
Ballyshannon Middle School
Camp Ernst Middle School
Conner Middle School
Gray Middle School
Ockerman Middle School
RA Jones Middle School

Elementary schools
Burlington Elementary School
Collins Elementary School 
Erpenbeck Elementary School
Florence Elementary School 
Goodridge Elementary School
Longbranch Elementary School
Kelly Elementary School
Mann Elementary School
New Haven Elementary School
North Pointe Elementary School 
Ockerman Elementary School
Stephens Elementary School
Thornwilde Elementary School
Yealey Elementary School
Steeplechase Elementary School

References

External links
Boone County Schools

School districts in Kentucky
Education in Boone County, Kentucky